The San Francisco Giants are a Major League Baseball team that plays in the National League Western Division.  Since their inception as the New York Gothams in 1883, the Giants have employed 37 managers.  The duties of the team manager include team strategy and leadership on and off the field.

The franchise's first manager was John Clapp, who managed the team for one year before being replaced in 1884 by Jim Price.  The New York Giants won two World Series championships during the 19th century, in 1888 and 1889, with Jim Mutrie as their manager both years. John McGraw became the Giants' manager during the 1902 season, beginning a streak of 54 consecutive years in which the Giants were managed by a Baseball Hall of Famer.  McGraw managed for the better course of 30 years (he missed parts of the 1924, 1925, and 1927 seasons due to illness; Hughie Jennings took over for the former two while Rogers Hornsby served as player-manager for the latter), doing so until the middle of the  season, the longest managerial tenure in Giants history.  McGraw won 2,583 games as the Giants manager, the most in Giants history.  While managing the Giants, the team won the National League championship 10 times—in 1904, 1905, 1911, 1912, 1913, 1917, 1921, 1922, 1923 and 1924.  They played in the World Series nine times (no World Series was played in 1904) and won three, in 1905, 1921 and 1922.

McGraw's successor was Hall of Famer Bill Terry, who managed the team from the middle of the 1932 season until 1941.  He won 823 games as the Giants' manager, fourth-most in Giants history, and won three National League championships, in 1933, 1936 and 1937, winning the World Series in 1933.  Hall of Famers Mel Ott and Leo Durocher managed the team from 1942 through 1955.  Durocher was the manager for the Giants' World Series championship in 1954.

The Giants moved from New York to San Francisco in 1958, with Bill Rigney as their manager.  They won their first National League championship in San Francisco under Alvin Dark in 1962 but lost the World Series that year.  In their first 28 years in San Francisco, they had 14 managers (including two terms by Rigney).  Since 1985, the Giants' managerial situation has been more stable. Roger Craig managed the team for more than seven seasons, from the middle of the 1985 season until 1992, including a National League championship in 1989.  His successor, Dusty Baker, managed the team for ten years from 1993 through 2002, winning the National League championship in 2002.  Baker has the third-highest win total of any Giants manager with 840. Felipe Alou replaced Baker in 2003 and managed the team until 2006.  Bruce Bochy managed the team from the 2007 season through 2019, winning World Series championships in 2010, 2012, and 2014, and has the second-most wins among all Giants managers.  Mutrie has the highest winning percentage of any Giants manager, with .605. Heinie Smith has the lowest, with .156, although he managed just 32 games.  The lowest winning percentage of any Giants manager who managed at least 100 games is .389, by Jim Davenport in 1985.

Table key

Managers 

Statistics current through 2021 season.

Managers with multiple tenures

Footnotes 
Although the Giants won the tournament called the World Series twice before 1900, the 19th century World Series was a very different event from the current World Series, which began to be played in 1903.  The 19th century World Series was considered an exhibition contest between the champion of the National League and the champion of the American Association.
#: A running total of the number of Giants' managers. Thus, any manager who has two or more separate terms is only counted once.
Dusty Baker won the Manager of the Year Award in 1993, 1997 and 2000.

References 
General

 

Specific

San Francisco Giants
San Francisco Giants managers
Managers